Constantin Coandă (4 March 1857 – 30 September 1932) was a Romanian soldier and politician.

Biography 
Constantin Coandă was born in Craiova. He reached the rank of general in the Romanian Army, and later became a mathematics professor at the National School of Bridges and Roads in Bucharest. Among his seven children was Henri Coandă, the discoverer of the Coandă effect.

During World War I, for a short time (24 October – 29 November 1918), he was the Prime Minister of Romania and the Foreign Affairs Minister. He participated in the signing of the Treaty of Neuilly between the Allies of World War I and Bulgaria.

On 8 December 1920, during his term as President of the Senate of Romania (representing Alexandru Averescu's People's Party), he was badly wounded by a bomb set up by the terrorist and anarchist Max Goldstein.

Military functions 
 Platoon commander in the 1st Artillery Regiment (1877 – 1883) 
 Positions in military education at the Bucharest School of Artillery, Engineering and Naval Officers and at the Superior School of War 
 Command and staff functions 
 Commander of the 2nd Artillery Regiment 
 Commander of the 5th Army Corps 
 Secretary General of the Ministry of War 
 Commander of the Bucharest Citadel 
 Military attaché in Berlin, Vienna and Paris 
 Director of the Artillery Department of the Ministry of War 
 Head of department in the General Staff 
 Inspector General of Artillery.

Other positions 
 Teacher at the Bucharest Bridge and Roads School 
 Delegate to the International Conference in The Hague 
 Military and diplomatic attaché near the Quarter of Tsar Nicholas II (1916 – 1918) 
 Minister of Industry (March 20 – July 14, 1926) 
 Minister Secretary of State (August 10, 1926 – June 4, 1927) .

Writings 
 Artillery Course (1884 – 1885)
 Projectiles and Missiles (1884).

Death 
Constantin Coandă died on 30 September 1932, aged 75, in Bucharest.

References

1857 births
1932 deaths
People from Craiova
People of the Principality of Wallachia
People's Party (interwar Romania) politicians
Prime Ministers of Romania
Romanian Ministers of Foreign Affairs
Romanian Ministers of Industry and Commerce
Presidents of the Senate of Romania
Members of the Senate of Romania
Romanian Land Forces generals
Romanian Army World War I generals
Romanian people of World War I
Academic staff of the Politehnica University of Bucharest